Village Green, originally named Baldwin Hills Village, is a neighborhood at the foot of Baldwin Hills, within the city of Los Angeles, California.  Village Green consists of a large condominium complex that is both a Los Angeles Historic-Cultural Monument and a National Historic Landmark.  Designed in the late 1930s and built out by 1942, it is one of the oldest planned communities of its type in the nation. Village Green was named by The American Institute of Architects as one of the 100 most important architectural achievements in U.S. history.

Geography

Village Green is located between Obama Boulevard and Coliseum Street, and between Hauser Blvd. and slightly west of La Brea Avenue, in the northwestern South Los Angeles region. The Baldwin Village neighborhood is just east of Village Green and La Brea Avenue.  The site design consists of outer vehicular circulation roads, with spur roadways between some of the buildings of the complex.  At its center is an elongated oval greensward, lined and crossed by paved walkways.  Smaller garden courts extend outward from the central area between the residence buildings.  The spur roads provide access to garage buildings, which also historically housed access to common facilities such as laundry rooms.  The residences are one or two story frame structures finished in plaster, with the living units organized so that the living room and master bedroom face one of the garden spaces.

History

Origin
The Baldwin Hills Village complex was built in 1942 as one of the most ambitiously planned communities in Los Angeles at the time, with 627 apartments grouped in buildings on a very large landscaped site. The Modernist Garden city style complex, which encompassed 627 units, was designed by architect Reginald D. Johnson, consulting architect Clarence S. Stein, with the firm of Wilson, Merill & Alexander, and landscape architect Fred Barlow, Jr. It also featured a mural by Italian-American artist Rico Lebrun. The units seldom have more than two bedrooms, and tend to attract seniors and younger professionals as residents.  As one of the first such establishments, the Village Green was also designed with the requirements of car-owners in mind.

Landmark status
As Baldwin Hills Village, Village Green was declared a Los Angeles Historic-Cultural Monuments in 1977, listed on the National Register of Historic Places in 1993, and a National Historic Landmark historic district in 2001.

Gallery

See also

List of National Historic Landmarks in California
National Register of Historic Places listings in Los Angeles, California
List of Los Angeles Historic-Cultural Monuments in South Los Angeles

References

External links
 Village Green Owners Association Web Site
 baldwinhillsvillageandthevillagegreen.blogspot.com
Village Green History Talks by Gailyn Saroyan

Neighborhoods in Los Angeles
Baldwin Hills, Los Angeles
Crenshaw, Los Angeles
Planned residential developments
Residential condominiums in the United States
Los Angeles Historic-Cultural Monuments
Historic districts in Los Angeles
National Register of Historic Places in Los Angeles
National Historic Landmarks in California
Apartment buildings in Los Angeles
Residential buildings completed in 1942
Modernist architecture in California
Historic districts on the National Register of Historic Places in California
1942 establishments in California